The 2021–22 season is Raków Częstochowa's third consecutive campaign in the Ekstraklasa, the top-flight of Polish football. In addition to the domestic league, the club is competing in the Polish Cup, the Polish SuperCup, and the inaugural edition of the UEFA Europa Conference League.

On 17 July 2021, Raków Częstochowa defeated reigning Ekstraklasa title holders Legia Warsaw in penalties in the Polish SuperCup.

On 2 May 2022, Raków defeated Lech Poznań 3–1 and secured its second consecutive Polish Cup.

First-team squad

Transfers

In

Pre-season and friendlies

Competitions

Overall record

Ekstraklasa

League table

Results summary

Results by round

Matches

Polish Cup

Polish SuperCup

UEFA Europa Conference League

Second qualifying round

Third qualifying round

Play-off round

Squad statistics

Goal scorers

Clean sheets

Notes

References

External links

Raków Częstochowa
Raków Częstochowa
Raków Częstochowa